Aphrodite Liti (born 1953) is a Greek sculptor, and professor of sculpture at the Athens School of Fine Arts.

Liti was born in Athens in 1953. She studied at the Athens School of Fine Arts and the University of London.

Liti has been professor of sculpture at the Athens School of Fine Arts since 2000.

Her 1.8 metre-tall statue of the soprano Maria Callas, unveiled in October 2021 at the base of the Acropolis in Athens, has been "ridiculed in cartoons and generated a social media storm".

References
 

1953 births
Living people
Greek sculptors
Athens School of Fine Arts alumni
Academic staff of the Athens School of Fine Arts
Alumni of the University of London
Women sculptors
Artists from Athens